Wingfield  is a suburb situated north of Adelaide. It lies between the Port River Expressway on the north and Grand Junction Road on the south. The suburb borders Dry Creek to its north and east, bounded by the Gawler railway line and Adelaide-Port Augusta railway line on the east. The North-South Motorway and Dry Creek-Port Adelaide railway line both cross the suburb. Wingfield is named after R. W. Wingfield, the private secretary to Governor of South Australia, William Jervois.

Government 

The suburb is in the City of Port Adelaide Enfield local government area.

Major industries 

The southwestern corner of the suburb includes residential housing, however the majority of the suburb is industrial. Industry includes recycling, manufacturing and freight forwarding.

Waste and resource recovery
Wingfield is the site of the 94ha Wingfield Waste & Recycling Centre (commonly known as the Wingfield Tip or Wingfield Dump), formerly owned and operated by the Adelaide City Council, and now operated as a "collaborative cluster of commercial businesses" including Orora, Adelaide Resource Recovery, Jeffries Group and Transpacific Industries. Between 1952 and 2004, the Wingfield site was operated as a landfill dump.  Since 2004 it has become a waste and recycling transfer centre, with all waste being sorted into recyclable products or waste products. The waste is compacted and transferred to other landfill sites north of Adelaide, at Dublin and Inkerman.

Motorsport
Wingfield is home to Australia's only dedicated junior Motorcycle speedway track, the Sidewinders Speedway located at the Wingfield Reserve on Eighth Street adjacent to the Wingfield Tip.

References 

Suburbs of Adelaide